The Sandra Day O'Connor Institute For American Democracy is a non-profit organization founded in 2009 by U.S. Supreme Court Justice Sandra Day O'Connor following her retirement from the Court. Headquartered in Phoenix, Arizona, United States, its mission is to "continue Justice Sandra Day O’Connor’s legacy and lifetime work to advance American Democracy through civics education, civic engagement and civil discourse". Leaders and luminaries who have spoken at the O'Connor Institute include General Colin Powell, President George W. Bush and the former Soviet Union President Mikhail Gorbachev.

History
The Institute, a non-profit, nonpartisan organization, was originally founded as an effort to save and preserve the historic adobe home of Sandra Day O'Connor which was slated for demolition. The house, built in 1959 in Paradise Valley, Arizona, was painstakingly dismantled brick by brick and successfully reassembled in a new location in Tempe's Papago Park near the Arizona Historical Society in 2009 and named O'Connor House thereafter. The O'Connor Institute For American Democracy conserves the house. In 2019, it was listed on the National Register of Historic Places as the Sandra Day O'Connor House. In 2015, Justice O'Connor and the organization's Board of Directors authorized the renaming from O'Connor House to the Sandra Day O'Connor Institute to better represent the broader spectrum of programs and emphasis on civil discourse, civic engagement and civics education . In 2020, inspired by the wishes and directive of Justice Sandra Day O’Connor, the Sandra Day O’Connor Institute For American Democracy was launched to reflect the organization's commitment to advance and preserve American Democracy through civil discourse, civic engagement and civics education providing a spectrum of programs for multi-generational impact. The Institute's programs serve individuals of all ages from 50 states and six continents through its digital education platform, O'Connor U.

Programs

O'Connor U
Launched in 2020, O'Connor U consists of free, online, multi-generation educational programs which include civic engagement webinars, podcasts, interactive online lectures, and civics education digital experiences. O’Connor U programs provide a critical depth of understanding on our system of self-government, history and culture.

Constitution Series: Equality And Justice For All
Free, online forums bring nationally renowned scholars and historians to discuss issues of constitutional rights, racial equality and related topics, while providing an interactive forum for civil dialogue, including audience Q&A. Thousands of viewers from across the country and around the world have logged on to participate in the Constitution Series.

O'Connor Civics Challenge 
In 2020, the O'Connor Institute launched the O'Connor Civics Challenge, a national competition for 6th - 9th grade students. For the Challenge, "Students will...choose one civics topic from a list of options, receive instructions, and then produce a creative video on that topic, three minutes or less in length. Winners will be awarded Apple products." The Civics Challenge launched together with the institute's online education initiative known as O'Connor U.

Digital Library and Resource Center 
The Sandra Day O’Connor Digital Library "showcases Justice O’Connor’s historic accomplishments across her decades of work in public service" and "catalogs the life and work of Justice Sandra Day O’Connor, the first woman to serve on the United States Supreme Court." According to the institute, the launch of the Digital Library has meant that, "For the first time, Justice O’Connor’s body of work across her decades in public service is available in an easily accessible, searchable format." The Library is the "world's most comprehensive online collection of Justice Sandra Day O'Connor's life and work.

Distinguished Speakers Series
The O'Connor Institute Distinguished Speakers Series features prominent individuals who have fostered civil discourse in their careers. Past speakers have included the former U.S. Secretary of State Condoleezza Rice, the former President of South Africa and Nobel Peace Prize recipient F.W. de Klerk, the former Finnish Minister of Defense Elisabeth Rehn, the Pulitzer Prize winner David McCullough, the Human Rights Foundation chairman and past world chess champion Garry Kasparov, the retired Admiral and NATO Supreme Allied Commander Europe James Stavridis, the former CIA Director James Woolsey and First Lady Laura Bush.

Annual History Dinner
The O'Connor Institute Annual History Dinner presents educational dinners highlighting historic figures, with a notable speaker. Past dinners have showcased Abraham Lincoln (with the Pulitzer Prize winner Doris Kearns Goodwin), Thomas Jefferson (with the Pulitzer Prize winner Jon Meacham) and John F. Kennedy (with Ambassador Caroline Kennedy).

Camp O'Connor
Conceived in 2014 by O'Connor, the goal of Camp O'Connor is to "educate, inspire and encourage the next generation of citizens…to develop a deeper understanding of our democracy". The O'Connor Institute delivers this five-day "democracy boot camp" for middle school students each summer in Phoenix. Due to the COVID-19 pandemic, Camp O'Connor 2020 was postponed to 2021.

Issues and Answers Forums
The institute hosts debates about various policies featuring speakers from all sides of each issue. Past topics have included independent expenditures, anonymous campaign finance contributions, so-called "dark money", legalization of recreational marijuana, and water and drought in the American Southwest.

Sandra Day O'Connor Scholarship
Each year, the institute provides a competitive scholarship for a promising law student at the Sandra Day O'Connor College of Law.

"Civics for Life" Podcast 
The O'Connor Institute's monthly podcast features interviews with guests in public service or academia whose work intersects with the institute's focus on civil discourse, civics education, and civic engagement. Guests have included Governor of Vermont Phil Scott, former U.S. Ambassador to Afghanistan Karl Eikenberry, and former President of Latvia Vaira Vike-Freiberga.

References

2009 establishments in Arizona
Active citizenship
Think tanks based in the United States
Non-profit organizations based in Arizona
Institute